Garratt Williamson (born 27 April 1971) is a retired New Zealand rugby union referee. He started officiating at international level in 2010 and at domestic level in 2005.

Career
Williamson started refereeing college games when he was 15, in 1986, before concentrating on playing the next year. After several seasons with the Paraparaumu senior side, Williamson went back to refereeing in 1997.

Williamson started his international career in 2010 refereeing Japan v Samoa in Tokyo. From 2011 onwards he was mainly an assistant referee, featuring in the 2012 June test series with Australia and Wales.

References

1971 births
New Zealand rugby union referees
Living people
People from Paraparaumu
Super Rugby referees